George Kendall Sharp (December 30, 1934 – March 24, 2022) was a senior United States district judge of the United States District Court for the Middle District of Florida.

Education and career

Sharp was born on December 30, 1934, in Chicago, Illinois. He received a Bachelor of Arts degree from Yale University in 1957. He received a Juris Doctor from the University of Virginia School of Law in 1963. He was a United States Naval Reserve Captain from 1957 to 1988. He was on active duty from 1957 to 1960. He was in private practice of law in Vero Beach, Florida, from 1963 to 1978. He was a public defender for the 19th Judicial Circuit from 1964 to 1968. He was a school board attorney of Indian River County from 1968 to 1978. He was a judge of the 19th Circuit Court in Vero Beach from 1978 to 1983. He was a member of the faculty of Indian River Community College (now Indian River State College) in Fort Pierce in 1979.

Federal judicial service

Sharp was nominated by President Ronald Reagan on November 1, 1983, to a seat on the United States District Court for the Middle District of Florida vacated by Judge Ben Krentzman. He was confirmed by the United States Senate on November 15, 1983, and received commission on November 16, 1983. He assumed senior status on January 1, 2000. He served in the Orlando division of the court. He died March 24, 2022.

Notable cases

In 1991, Sharp "rejected charges by the National Highway Traffic Safety Administration that five automobile-window tinting shops in Florida violated federal safety standards by installing window film that blocked too much light." Sharp also presided over the 2008 case of former Backstreet Boys and NSYNC manager Lou Pearlman in connection with a long-running fraudulent investment scheme. Sharp sentenced Pearlman to 25 years in prison.

References

Sources
 

1934 births
2022 deaths
20th-century American judges
21st-century American judges
Florida state court judges
Judges of the United States District Court for the Middle District of Florida
Lawyers from Chicago
Military personnel from Illinois
Public defenders
United States district court judges appointed by Ronald Reagan
United States Navy officers
University of Virginia School of Law alumni
Yale University alumni